Agustín Moreno (born 31 March 1967) is a former tennis player from Mexico.

Moreno represented his native country at the 1988 Summer Olympics in Seoul, where he was defeated in the second round by Sweden's Stefan Edberg. The right-hander reached his highest singles ATP-ranking on July 18, 1988, when he became the number 120 of the world. Moreno's career high ranking in doubles was 40. He became World number 1 in the junior ITF rankings after winning Wimbledon. Moreno was a key player in the Mexican Davis cup team during his era. He is currently the Head Women's coach of Loyola Marymount University in Los Angeles

Career finals

Doubles (2 runner-ups)

External links
 
 
 
 
 
 Bio at University of South Florida (USF)

1967 births
Living people
Mexican male tennis players
Olympic tennis players of Mexico
Sportspeople from Guadalajara, Jalisco
Tennis players at the 1988 Summer Olympics
Wimbledon junior champions
Pan American Games medalists in tennis
Pan American Games silver medalists for Mexico
Tennis players at the 1987 Pan American Games
Grand Slam (tennis) champions in boys' doubles
Central American and Caribbean Games medalists in tennis
Central American and Caribbean Games gold medalists for Mexico
Central American and Caribbean Games silver medalists for Mexico
20th-century Mexican people